Yuri Zagirbekovich Magdiýew (born 2 December 1971) is a Turkmenistani professional football coach and a former player who is currently a coach at Dagestan Kaspiysk football school. As a player, he made his debut in the Russian First Division in 2001 for FC Kristall Smolensk.

International goals

References

External links
 
 
 

1971 births
Living people
Sportspeople from Ashgabat
Turkmenistan footballers
Association football midfielders
Turkmenistan international footballers
Turkmenistan expatriate footballers
Turkmenistan football managers
Turkmenistan expatriate sportspeople in Kazakhstan
Turkmenistan expatriate sportspeople in Ukraine
Turkmenistan expatriate sportspeople in Russia
Turkmenistan expatriate sportspeople in Belarus
Turkmenistan expatriate sportspeople in Armenia
Expatriate footballers in Kazakhstan
Expatriate footballers in Ukraine
Expatriate footballers in Russia
Expatriate footballers in Belarus
Expatriate footballers in Armenia
Expatriate football managers in Russia
Ukrainian Premier League players
FK Köpetdag Aşgabat players
FC Kremin Kremenchuk players
FC Nyva Ternopil players
FC Taraz players
FC Kristall Smolensk players
FC Sodovik Sterlitamak players
FC Darida Minsk Raion players
FC Mika players
Footballers at the 1998 Asian Games
Asian Games competitors for Turkmenistan